Porcellio uljanini is a species of woodlouse in the genus Porcellio belonging to the family Porcellionidae that is endemic to Ukraine.

References

Porcellionidae
Crustaceans described in 1885
Endemic fauna of Ukraine
Woodlice of Europe